Alexander Trujillo (born August 28, 1974) is a retired professional boxer from Puerto Rico, who was nicknamed "Alexander the Great" during his career.

References

External links
 

1974 births
Living people
Welterweight boxers
Sportspeople from San Juan, Puerto Rico
Boxers at the 1995 Pan American Games
Puerto Rican male boxers
Pan American Games silver medalists for Puerto Rico
Pan American Games medalists in boxing
Central American and Caribbean Games silver medalists for Puerto Rico
Competitors at the 1993 Central American and Caribbean Games
Central American and Caribbean Games medalists in boxing
Medalists at the 1995 Pan American Games